ʿUbayd Allāh ibn Marwān ibn al-Ḥakam was an Umayyad prince and commander. He was the son of the Umayyad caliph Marwan I and the latter's wife Umm Aban al-Kubra, a daughter of Caliph Uthman.

Ubayd Allah's half-brother Caliph Abd al-Malik appointed him as one of the commanders of the near-annual raids against the Byzantine frontier with the Umayyad Caliphate. Abd al-Malik also appointed Ubayd Allah, for an unclear period, the governor of the Balqa, a subdistrict of the Damascus district spanning the area between Syria and Wadi al-Qura (in northwestern Arabia). Ubayd Allah's full brothers Aban and Uthman also held command roles under Abd al-Malik.

References

Bibliography

7th-century Arabs
Generals of the Umayyad Caliphate
Sons of Umayyad caliphs
7th-century people from the Umayyad Caliphate
8th-century people from the Umayyad Caliphate
8th-century Arabs
Umayyad people of the Arab–Byzantine wars